CDKAL1 (Cdk5 regulatory associated protein 1-like 1) is a gene in the methylthiotransferase family. The complete physiological function and implications of this have not been fully determined. CDKAL1 is known to code for CDK5, a regulatory subunit-associated protein 1. This protein CDK5 regulatory subunit-associated protein 1 is found broadly across tissue types including neuronal tissues and pancreatic beta cells. CDKAL1 is suspected to be involved in the CDK5/p35 pathway, in which p35 is the activator for CDK5 which regulates several neuronal functions.

Structure and function 

Structurally CDKAL1 contains two iron (Fe) sulfur (S) clusters, therefore its function can be reduced by inhibiting Fe-S cluster biosynthesis.  Enzymatically, CDKAL1 catalyzes methylthiolation of N6-threonylcarbamoyl adenosine 37 (t6A37)  in cytosolic tRNA, which has been determined to stabilize anticodon-codon interactions during translation.

Clinical significance 

In humans, CDKAL1 is indicated to be involved in type II diabetes. CDKAL1 and TCF7L2  have been shown to reduce the production of insulin. Some studies indicate that CDKAL1 variants modify tRNA resulting in increased risks of type II diabetes as well as obesity.  Variation in CDKAL1 was also attributed to differences in energy regulation. Single nucleotide polymorphism analysis resulted in the discovery of the mechanism of glucose and insulin responses demonstrated in  the figure. From this relationship, it has been hypothesized that  the regulatory genes CDKAL1 and GIP(glucose-dependent insulinotropic polypeptide) are related to environmental selectivity and adaptive immunity.

Genome-wide association studies have linked single nucleotide polymorphisms in an intron on chromosome 6 with susceptibility to type 2 diabetes`. [provided by RefSeq, May 2010].

Animal studies 

In mice, CDKAL1 impairment reduces the mouse's ability to maintain glucose homeostasis and causes pancreatic islet hypertrophy, or pancreatic lesions.

References

External links

Further reading